The name Cary has been used for three tropical cyclones in the western north Pacific Ocean.

Tropical Storm Cary (1980) (T8022, 26W), while forming, it crossed the Philippines without impact
Typhoon Cary (1984) (T8405, 05W), no impact on land
Typhoon Cary (1987) (T8711, 10W, Ising), made landfall on Luzon, Philippines, and later in northern Vietnam

Pacific typhoon set index articles